Fernandez-Vargas v. Gonzales, 548 U.S. 30 (2006), is a United States Supreme Court case that considered Humberto Fernandez-Vargas, a Mexican citizen who, after being deported, illegally reentered the United States in 1982, and remained undetected for over 20 years, fathering a son in 1989 and marrying the boy's mother, a U.S. citizen, in 2001. He filed an application to adjust his status to that of a lawful permanent resident, but the Government began proceedings to reinstate his 1981 deportation order under §241(a)(5) of the Immigration and Nationality Act, and deported him.

Fernandez-Vargas argued that because he illegally reentered the country before the IIRIRA's effective date, §241(a)(5) did not bar his application for an adjustment of status, and that §241(a)(5) would be impermissibly retroactive if it did bar his adjustment application. The Court held that Section 241(a)(5) applies to those who reentered the U.S. before IIRIRA's effective date and does not retroactively affect any right of, or impose any burden on, the continuing violator of the INA now before this Court.

References

External links
 

United States Supreme Court cases
United States Supreme Court cases of the Roberts Court
United States immigration and naturalization case law
2006 in international relations
2006 in United States case law